Wivina is a feminine given name. It can refer to:

Wivina (1103–1168), Benedictine abbess
Wivina Belmonte, UNICEF representative
Wivina Demeester (born 1943), Flemish politician